Wolfgang Felix Magath (born 26 July 1953) is a German football manager and former player.

The most notable spell of his playing career was with Hamburger SV, with whom he won three Bundesliga titles, the 1977 European Cup Winners' Cup Final and the 1983 European Cup Final, scoring in both Finals. He also gained 43 international caps for the West Germany national team, winning UEFA Euro 1980 and reaching two consecutive World Cup finals.

As a manager, Magath's honours include two consecutive Doubles (Bundesliga and German Cup titles) with Bayern Munich, and a further Bundesliga title with VfL Wolfsburg in 2009. He has a reputation of demanding strong discipline and thorough training.

In 2014, Magath coached English club Fulham, becoming the first German to manage in the Premier League.

Playing career
Born near Aschaffenburg, Magath started his career playing for local club Viktoria Aschaffenburg. From 1974 to 1976, he played for 1. FC Saarbrücken, at that time in the second division, before moving to Hamburger SV in the top flight.  He spent the following ten seasons with Hamburg, and from his debut in 1976 to his retirement he scored 46 goals in 306 games in the West German top flight.

In 1983, Magath led Hamburg to success in the European Cup, scoring the single goal in the final against Juventus; in 1980–81, he netted a career-best (in the first division) ten goals, helping his side to a runner-up league spot, as Hamburg also won the league in three years during that time.

Magath also represented the West Germany national team at many international events, including the 1982 and 1986 FIFA World Cups, helping West Germany finish in second place both times. He was also part of the squad that won the 1980 UEFA European Championship. Magath made his debut on 30 April 1977, in a 2–1 friendly win with Yugoslavia, and went on to amass 43 caps, with three goals.

Managerial career

1986–1992: General manager
Having suffered a career-ending knee injury, Magath retired shortly after the 1986 World Cup and became general manager for his former club Hamburg. He left Hamburg in June 1988 after moderate success. His next stints as general manager included then 2. Bundesliga side 1. FC Saarbrücken (November 1989 to June 1990) as well as Bayer Uerdingen (July 1990 to January 1992) who were relegated from the first tier during Magath's time at the club.

1992–2001: Early coaching career
Magath took up coaching in 1992 as a player-coach for the fourth-tier club FC Bremerhaven which he led to division championship. He then rejoined Hamburger SV as reserves coach in 1993 and became manager Benno Möhlmann's assistant soon after. Magath succeeded Möhlmann as manager after the latter was sacked in October 1995. His first match was a 2–2 draw against 1860 Munich. Having reached the UEFA Cup during his first season, Hamburg finished in fifth place. The following season as disappointing 15th at the time Magath was sacked. His final match was a 4–0 loss to 1. FC Köln. He finished with a record of 28 wins, 19 draws, and 22 losses.

In the following years, Magath acquired a reputation as the fireman, coming in at difficult times at a club and leading it to salvation. In September 1997, he took over 1. FC Nürnberg who were newly promoted to the 2. Bundesliga and fighting relegation. His first match was a 0–0 draw against KFC Uerdingen 05. Der Club finished the season in third–place, meaning promotion to the Bundesliga, but Magath left due to differences in opinion with the club president Michael A. Roth. He finished with a record of 16 wins, eight draws, and five losses. During a short stint at Werder Bremen during the 1998–99 season, Magath lead the club out of relegation places, only for Bremen to find themselves in the relegation dogfight again with two games to go. At this point he was replaced as manager by Thomas Schaaf who helped them avoid relegation by a point. Magath also helped Bremen get to the final of the DFB-Pokal however he was sacked before the final itself, which Bremen won in his absence. He had nine wins, seven draws, and ten losses. Halfway through the 1999–00 season, Magath joined troubled Eintracht Frankfurt. An impressive Magath-inspired run saw Frankfurt finish the second round as third best and four points off relegation. Magath was sacked the season after (29 January 2001) when Frankfurt found themselves in the relegation zone. His last match was a 5–1 loss to Köln. He finished with record of 15 wins, five draws, and 17 losses.

2001–2007: Head coach at Stuttgart and Bayern

Magath bounced back with what was to become one of his most successful stints when he took over fellow relegation battlers VfB Stuttgart a few weeks after. Having narrowly avoided relegation in 2001, Stuttgart finished the 2001–02 in a mid-table position. The club went then on to become 2002–03 Bundesliga runners-up and finished the 2003–04 season as respectable fourth. During this time, Magath also introduced a group of players from the Stuttgart youth ranks, such as Timo Hildebrand, Andreas Hinkel and Kevin Kurányi, who became known as "die jungen Wilden" (wild youth). The Stuttgart stint was also the first time Magath combined the head coach and the director of football roles. He finished with a record of 73 wins, 37 draws, and 37 losses.

Having impressed with Stuttgart, Magath was handed the FC Bayern Munich job on 1 July 2004. In his first season, Magath was able to lead his team to victory in both the league and cup, completing the double, a feat which would be repeated in 2005–06, the first time ever in the competition's history.

However, after a slow start to the 2006–07 season, with the team mired in fourth place which would not qualify them for the Champions League, Magath was sacked on 31 January 2007. He finished with a record of 84 wins, 25 draws, and 22 losses.

2007–2012: Head coach and director of football combined
In June 2007, Magath signed a contract with VfL Wolfsburg, as head coach and director of football. Magath lead the Wolves to play in the 2008–09 UEFA Cup and the following season's Champions League, the latter as league champions for the first time. He finished with a record of 46 wins, 18 draws, and 21 losses.

Before the season 2008–09 had ended, Magath agreed on a four-year contract with Schalke 04, again as both head coach and director of football, starting on 1 July 2009. Schalke finished Magath's first season in charge as runners-up, but after a series of disappointing domestic performances and growing player discontent, Magath was sacked by Schalke in March 2011. the following day, Magath claimed that he had not been informed of his dismissal. He finished with a record of 42 wins, 16 draws, and 21 losses.

Only 48 hours later, on 18 March, Magath once again signed with now relegation-battling VfL Wolfsburg, the side he had previously led to the league title in 2009. Magath steered the club to safety, avoiding the relegation play–off by two points, but though the club invested heavily, Magath could only achieve a mid-table finish in the following 2011–12 season. After only five points in eight matches (and no goals and points in the last four games) in the 2012–13 season, Magath left the club by mutual consent on 25 October 2012. He finished with a record of 18 wins, 10 draws, and 24 losses.

2014–2017: Return to management with Fulham and Shandong Luneng Taishan
On 14 February 2014, Fulham released a statement that Magath would be their new first team manager effective immediately on an eighteen-month contract. Magath brought in Tomas Oral as first team coach and Werner Leuthard as the person in charge of conditioning while the club dismissed manager Rene Meulensteen, assistant coach Ray Wilkins, technical director Alan Curbishley, and first team coaches Mick Priest and Jonathan Hill. The role was Magath's first in two years and at the time his only venture outside of his native Germany. Magath believed that he could save Fulham from relegation and that 12 matches was enough to save the club. Fulham played their first match under Magath on 22 February 2014. The match ended in a 1–1 draw with Ashkan Dejagah, Magath's former player at VfL Wolfsburg, being the first Fulham goalscorer of Magath's tenure. 

On 15 March, Fulham won their first match with Magath in charge against Newcastle United, with Dejagah being the lone scorer. Magath picked up four points from his first six matches and answered questions about a potential resignation. On 3 May 2014, Fulham were relegated from the Premier League after a 4–1 loss to Stoke City. Magath believed that Fulham could earn immediate promotion. He started the 2014–15 season with four consecutive losses to Ipswich Town, Millwall, Wolverhampton Wanderers and Derby County. On 18 September 2014 Magath was sacked as Fulham manager after a run of eleven league games without a win. He finished with a record of four wins, four draws, and 12 losses.

After Gerald Baumgartner was sacked by Austria Wien, Magath eventually became the "preferred" choice. Spartak Moscow also offered Magath a contract. Thorsten Fink and Dmitriy Alenichev took the coaching jobs. He eventually took the job at Shandong Luneng Taishan, replacing former Brazil national football team manager Mano Menezes. He took the job on 8 June 2016. He made his debut on 12 June 2016 in a 2–1 loss against Hebei China Fortune. His first win was a 2–1 win against Jiangsu Suning on 9 July 2016. Four days later, he got his second win against Shijiazhuang Ever Bright, a 4–0 win.

He led Luneng throughout the 2017 Chinese Super League, finishing 6th, but left the club shortly after the end of the season.

2020–present: FLYERALARM Global Soccer
In January 2020, Magath revealed that his time as a coach was over and that he wanted to "help football in a different way". In step with this, he introduced himself as the new boss of FLYERALARM Global Soccer. Magath became responsible for FLYERALARM's commitment to the clubs Würzburger Kickers in Germany and Flyeralarm Admira, formerly known as FC Admira Wacker Mödling.

2022: Hertha BSC

On 13 March 2022, Magath became Hertha BSC's third head coach of the 2021–22 season after he replaced Tayfun Korkut, who had replaced Pál Dárdai in November 2021. On 17 March 2022, Magath tested positive for COVID-19 and had to postpone his debut match.

Reputation
As a manager, Magath quickly gained respect and became known for his hard, grinding training methods, laying heavy emphasis on discipline, fitness and conditioning. Players gave him nicknames like "Saddam" (Saddam Hussein) or "Quälix", a rhyming mash of his first name Felix and the German verb "quälen" (to torture). He was once described by former Eintracht Frankfurt player Bachirou Salou as the "last dictator in Europe". 

After leaving Fulham in September 2014, bizarre stories emerged about how Magath had suggested that Brede Hangeland rub cheese on a thigh injury. Magath stated that Hangeland did not have a thigh injury but an inflammation of the knee, and that he suggested the additional use of an alternative treatment with a bandage (dressing) consisting of Quark. Fulham player Sascha Riether later said that the story was greatly exaggerated and that Magath had suggested he use a traditional topfen curd.

Personal life

Magath is the son of a Puerto Rican former soldier in the United States Army stationed in Aschaffenburg and a German mother. In 1954, Magath's father abandoned Magath and his mother to return to his homeland. The adolescent Magath first heard from his father when he was 15 years old, after he wrote a letter to Puerto Rico.

Magath is also a chess enthusiast, an interest which he developed during the 1978 World Chess Championship while he was bedridden due to hepatitis. In 1985, he played in a simultaneous exhibition against Garry Kasparov.

Career statistics

Club

Managerial

Honours

Player
Hamburger SV
 Bundesliga: 1978–79, 1981–82, 1982–83
 European Cup: 1982–83
 European Cup Winners' Cup: 1976–77
 European Super Cup runner-up: 1977, 1983
 UEFA Cup runner-up: 1981–82

West Germany
 UEFA European Championship: 1980
 FIFA World Cup runner-up: 1982, 1986

Individual
 kicker Bundesliga Team of the Season: 1981–82, 1982–83

Manager
VfB Stuttgart
 UEFA Intertoto Cup: 2002

Bayern Munich
 Bundesliga: 2004–05, 2005–06
 DFB-Pokal: 2004–05, 2005–06
 DFB-Ligapokal: 2004

VfL Wolfsburg
 Bundesliga: 2008–09

Individual
 German Football Manager of the Year: 2003, 2005, 2009

See also
List of Puerto Ricans

References

External links
 
 
 

1953 births
Living people
People from Aschaffenburg
Sportspeople from Lower Franconia
Footballers from Bavaria
German people of Puerto Rican descent
German people of American descent
German footballers
Association football midfielders
Bundesliga players
2. Bundesliga players
Viktoria Aschaffenburg players
1. FC Saarbrücken players
Hamburger SV players
Germany international footballers
Germany B international footballers
UEFA Euro 1980 players
1982 FIFA World Cup players
1986 FIFA World Cup players
UEFA European Championship-winning players
German football managers
German expatriate football managers
German expatriate sportspeople in England
Expatriate football managers in England
Expatriate football managers in China
Bundesliga managers
Premier League managers
English Football League managers
Hamburger SV managers
1. FC Nürnberg managers
SV Werder Bremen managers
Eintracht Frankfurt managers
VfB Stuttgart managers
FC Bayern Munich managers
VfL Wolfsburg managers
FC Schalke 04 managers
Fulham F.C. managers
Shandong Taishan F.C. managers
Hertha BSC managers
West German footballers
German expatriate sportspeople in China